Suck Run is a stream in the U.S. state of Ohio. It is a tributary of Eagle Creek.

See also
List of rivers of Ohio

References

Rivers of Adams County, Ohio
Rivers of Brown County, Ohio
Rivers of Ohio